John Broadhurst (1778 - 15 September 1861) was a Whig politician and the Member of Parliament (MP) for Weymouth and Melcombe Regis between October 1812 and June 1813, Hedon from December 1813 to June 1818 and Sudbury from June 1818 to March 1820.

Early life 
Broadhurst attended Eton College. He was a soldier, and fought in the Peninsular War and was present at the retreat of Corunna.

Parliamentary career 
Broadhurst's election as MP for Waymouth and Melcombe Regis was petitioned and overturned, with his election being declared void. Thomas Wallace, Henry Trail and Broadhurst was declared void after being found to have violated the Exemptions of Apothecaries Act 1694, and a by-election was held.

He was elected to Hedon in December 1813 in a by-election following the death of George Johnstone and then went on to stand for Sudbury in the 1818 general election, serving until the 1820 general election where he did not seek re-election.

Broadhurst never had a recorded speech in Parliament's Hansard during his time as an MP, however, The History of Parliament states that his only known speech was on 7 May 1818 where "he opposed a clause proposed for the Poor Law Amendment Bill which would take pauper children out of their parents’ care."

References 

1778 births
1861 deaths
UK MPs 1812–1818
UK MPs 1818–1820
People educated at Eton College
Members of the Parliament of the United Kingdom for Weymouth and Melcombe Regis
Members of the Parliament of the United Kingdom for Hedon
Members of Parliament of the United Kingdom for Sudbury
British Army officers
British Army personnel of the Peninsular War
Politicians from Derbyshire